In enzymology, a phosphatidylcholine---retinol O-acyltransferase is an enzyme that catalyzes the chemical reaction

phosphatidylcholine + retinol---[cellular-retinol-binding-protein]  2-acylglycerophosphocholine + retinyl-ester---[cellular-retinol-binding-protein]

Thus, the two substrates of this enzyme are phosphatidylcholine and [[retinol---[cellular-retinol-binding-protein]]], whereas its two products are 2-acylglycerophosphocholine and [[retinyl-ester---[cellular-retinol-binding-protein]]].

This enzyme belongs to the family of transferases, specifically those acyltransferases transferring groups other than aminoacyl groups.  The systematic name of this enzyme class is phosphatidylcholine:retinol---[cellular-retinol-binding-protein] O-acyltransferase. Other names in common use include lecithin---retinol acyltransferase, phosphatidylcholine:retinol-(cellular-retinol-binding-protein), and O-acyltransferase.

References

 
 

EC 2.3.1
Enzymes of unknown structure